Laoximen is an interchange station between Lines 8 and 10 of the Shanghai Metro. It began operation on 29 December 2007 with the opening of line 8. It became an interchange station with the opening of line 10 on 10 April 2010.

The name of the station is derived from the Old West Gate (or Laoximen) of the walled Chinese city.

The station is located in Huangpu District, near the intersection of Middle Fuxing Road and South Xizang Road.

Station Layout

Around the station
 Xiaotaoyuan Mosque

Shanghai Metro stations in Huangpu District
Railway stations in China opened in 2007
Line 10, Shanghai Metro